Liridon Vocaj (born 1 October 1993) is a Kosovan football midfielder who last played for Chemnitzer FC.

Club career
On 25 January 2019, Vocaj joined Chemnitzer FC on a contract for the rest of the season.

References

External links 
 
 
 Liridon Vocaj at Kicker

1993 births
Living people
Sportspeople from Peja
Association football midfielders
Kosovan footballers
German footballers
TSV 1860 Munich II players
Würzburger Kickers players
FC Rot-Weiß Erfurt players
Chemnitzer FC players
3. Liga players